Salluyu (Aymara, salla rocks, cliffs, uyu corral, "rock corral", also spelled Salluyo) is a mountain in the Apolobamba mountain range at the border of Bolivia and Peru, about  high. It is situated in the La Paz Department, Franz Tamayo Province, Pelechuco Municipality, near . Salluyu lies between the peaks of Chawpi Urqu (or Wisk'achani) in the north and Palumani in the south.

References 

Mountains of La Paz Department (Bolivia)